The 1982 Eisenhower Trophy took place 15 to 18 September at the Golf Club de Lausanne in Lausanne, Switzerland. It was the 13th World Amateur Team Championship for the Eisenhower Trophy. The tournament was a 72-hole stroke play team event with 30 four-man teams. The best three scores for each round counted towards the team total.

United States won the Eisenhower Trophy for the ninth time, finishing seven strokes ahead of the joint silver medalists, Japan and Sweden, with France finishing fourth. Luis Carbonetti, representing Argentina, had the lowest individual score, 4-under-par 284, a stroke better than Jay Sigel.

The event was affected by political protests about the participation of South Africa. Two of the stronger nations, Australia and Canada, did not compete while teams from Indonesia and Trinidad and Tobago attended the opening ceremony but later withdrew.

Teams
30 four-man teams contested the event.

The following table lists the players on the leading teams.

Scores

Source:

Individual leaders
There was no official recognition for the lowest individual scores.

Source:

References

External links
Record Book on International Golf Federation website 

Eisenhower Trophy
Golf tournaments in Switzerland
Eisenhower Trophy
Eisenhower Trophy
Eisenhower Trophy